Richard Quinn (3 December 1882 – 6 November 1925) was a British track and field athlete who competed in the 1908 Summer Olympics. Born in Ayr, he won seven straight Scottish walks titles over the three-mile distance. In 1908 he was eliminated in the first round of the 3500 metre walk competition.

References

External links
 

1882 births
1925 deaths
Sportspeople from Ayr
British male racewalkers
Scottish male racewalkers
Olympic athletes of Great Britain
Athletes (track and field) at the 1908 Summer Olympics